Sir Simon Manwaring Robertson (born 4 March 1941), is a British banker and businessman.

Biography
Simon Robertson attended Eton College.

He worked for Kleinwort Benson for 34 years, where he eventually served as chairman of the board. He then worked for Goldman Sachs, where he served as President of Goldman Sachs Europe. In 2004, he was appointed to the Board of Directors of Rolls-Royce, and he became chairman in January 2005. He also serves on the Boards of Directors of HSBC Holdings, Berry Brothers and Rudd, and The Economist. He has served on the Boards of the London Stock Exchange, Invensys, and Inchcape. He runs Simon Robertson Associates. He is a member of the 30% Club, a group of FTSE-100 Chairmen committed to having at least 30% of their Boardmembers being female.

He sits on the board of directors of the Royal Opera House, and on the board of trustees of the Eden Project. He is a member of White's. He was knighted in 2010. He is a member of the Conservative Party Foundation. He is reportedly worth £95 million.

Robertson was knighted in the 2010 Birthday Honours for "services to business".

References

Living people
1941 births
People educated at Eton College
British bankers
Goldman Sachs people
Rolls-Royce people
HSBC people
The Economist people
Conservative Party (UK) officials
Knights Bachelor
Businesspeople awarded knighthoods